Elk Lake School District is a small, rural, K-12 public school district with its only building located on State Route 3019 in Dimock, Susquehanna County, Pennsylvania. (Since the end of rural delivery from the Dimock post office, the school district has had a mailing address of nearby Springville.) It covers Auburn Township, Middletown Township, Rush Township, Dimock Township, and Springville Township in Susquehanna County, along with Meshoppen Borough and Meshoppen Township in Wyoming County. According to 2000 federal census data, Elk Lake School District serves a resident population of 7,735 people. In 2009, the district residents’ per capita income was $15,355, while the median family income was $38,385. In the Commonwealth, the median family income was $49,501 and the United States median family income was $49,445, in 2010. In 2006, the district students are 97% white, less than 1% Asian, less than 1% black and 2% Hispanic.

Elk Lake School District operates two schools: an elementary school and a junior senior high school. They are both in one building, connected by a natatorium used by both. The district also offers a taxpayer funded Head Start program for preschoolers.

History 
The Elk Lake School District was founded in 1957 as a joint school district, replacing the six main districts and "one room schoolhouses" in the district's seven civil subdivisions (six townships and one borough) in Susquehanna and Wyoming County. The schools had been located in Auburn Township, Dimock Township, Middletown Township, Rush Township, Springville Township and Meshoppen (one school served Meshoppen Borough and Meshoppen Township).  The school was legally reorganized on July 1, 1966, as a single fourth-class school district.

Activities 
The Elk Lake School District offers a variety of clubs, activities and an extensive sports program. Activities at the school include: Ski Club, Key Club, Future Business Leaders of America, Speech and Debate, Concert Band, Chorus, Starry Knights, Scholastic Bowl, DARE, and Theater and Drama.

Sports
The district funds:

Boys
Baseball - AA Varsity and JV
Basketball- AA Varsity and JV
Cross Country - A Varsity and JV
Golf - AA
Soccer - A Varsity and JV
Swimming and Diving - AA Varsity and JV
Tennis - AA Varsity and JV
Track and Field - AA Varsity and JV
Volleyball - AA Varsity and JV
Wrestling - AA Varsity and JV

Girls
Basketball - AA Varsity and JV
Cheerleading  - Basketball Varsity and JV
Cheerleading  - Wrestling Varsity and JV
Cross Country - A Varsity and JV
Field Hockey - AA Varsity and JV
Soccer (Fall) - A Varsity and JV
Softball - AA Varsity and JV
Swimming and Diving - AA Varsity and JV
Girls' Tennis - AA
Track and Field - AA Varsity and JV
Volleyball - Varsity and JV

Junior High School Sports

Boys
Baseball
Basketball
Cross Country
Soccer
Swimming and Diving
Tennis
Track and Field
Wrestling	

Girls
Basketball
Cross Country
Field Hockey
Softball 
Swimming and Diving
Tennis
Track and Field

According to PIAA directory July 2012 

The varsity boys' basketball team won two PIAA State Championships, in 1969 and 1977, the latter team going undefeated with a state record of 36 wins.

In 2008, the varsity boys Cross Country team won the PIAA AA State Championship. In 2010, both the boys and girls varsity cross country teams placed second (both to Holy Redeemer) at the PIAA District II meet. One of the top runners on the boys team was injured prior to the district meet. Just two weeks after the District II meet, both teams placed first in the state meet, a feat which has only been accomplished by one other team.

In 2009, Elk lake also sent their wrestling team to states after they upset Lake-Lehman 35-33.

Community swimming - Elk Lake High School also offers open swim on Tuesday and Wednesday nights from 6:30 P.M. until 8:30 P.M.

References 

School districts established in 1957
School districts in Susquehanna County, Pennsylvania
School districts in Wyoming County, Pennsylvania
1957 establishments in Pennsylvania